A Question of Honor is a 1922 American drama film directed by Edwin Carewe and written by Josephine Quirk. The film stars Anita Stewart, Guy Edward Hearn, Arthur Stuart Hull, Walt Whitman, Bert Sprotte, and Frank Beal. The film was released on March 11, 1922, by Associated First National Pictures.

Plot
As described in a film magazine, Anne Wilmot (Stewart) and her aunt Katherine (Farrington) leave Fifth Avenue to go to Arizona and spend a month at her fiance Leon Morse's (Hull) lodge in the mountains near an immense hydroelectric engineering project. Leon is determined to obtain a right-of-way across the site occupied by the dam for his railroad, but Bill Shannon (Hearn), the builder, has other views about it. Anne meets Bill when he rescues her from a perilous position on a rock endangered by the rising waters of a stream. Sheb (Whitman), his right hand man, warns Bill against all women, but he gives Anne some food when she pleads hunger and then makes her wash the dishes. Charles Burkthaler (Sprotte), hired by Leon to destroy the dam, places his men at crucial points. Anne notifies Bill of their scheme and cuts the wire to prevent them from blowing up the dam. A tunnel, however, is destroyed, and Anne is caught under the debris. Sheb finds her and takes her to Bill's cabin. Bill then learns that she has broken her engagement with Leon and says that he is satisfied to spend his life with her.

Cast      
Anita Stewart as Anne Wilmot
Guy Edward Hearn as Bill Shannon
Arthur Stuart Hull as Leon Morse
Walt Whitman as Sheb
Bert Sprotte as Charles Burkthaler
Frank Beal as Stephen Douglas
Adele Farrington as Mrs. Katherine Wilmot
Mary Land as Mrs. Elton 
Ed Brady as John Bretton
Walter Bytell as Parsons

References

External links

1922 films
1920s English-language films
Silent American drama films
1922 drama films
First National Pictures films
Films directed by Edwin Carewe
American silent feature films
American black-and-white films
1920s American films